Luc Benoist born Luc Didier Marie Benoist-Lucy (1893–1980) was a French essayist and art historian. He published many books about the art history. His interests were centered on spirituality and symbolism.

Biography 
He became assistant curator of the Palace of Versailles, curator of the Musées de France and of the Fine Arts Museum of Nantes (1947-1959).

Publications 

 The romantic Sculpture, Paris, La Renaissance du Livre, 1928, .
 Versailles and the monarchy, Paris, Editions of Cluny, 1947.
 "Michel-Ange", Lausanne, La Guilde du Livre, 1943.
 "Georges de La Tour et les caravagesques au Musée des Beaux-Arts de Nantes", La  Revue française, 1961.
 "L'ésotérisme", Paris, PUF, Collection "Que sais-je", 1963.

1893 births
1980 deaths
20th-century French non-fiction writers
20th-century French male writers
French curators
French male essayists
20th-century French essayists